If All the Guys in the World (original French title: Si tous les gars du monde) is a film made 1955. It won a BAFTA Award in 1957, a Crystal Globe award at the Karlovy Vary International Film Festival in 1956, and a Best Screenplay-Foreign Film award at the San Sebastián International Film Festival in 1956, as well as a Golden Laurel winner at the Edinburgh Film Festival.

Plot
A French fishing trawler crew in the North Sea becomes incapacitated after eating contaminated food while in the middle of a storm. The story follows the efforts of an international collection of amateur radio operators to deliver an antidote.

References

External links
 
 If all the Guys in the World program note from 1957 San Francisco International Film Festival

1956 films
1950s French-language films
1950s adventure films
French black-and-white films
Films directed by Christian-Jaque
Crystal Globe winners
Films with screenplays by Henri-Georges Clouzot
French adventure films
1950s French films